Tuomas is a male given name common in Finland. It is the Finnish version of the name Thomas. Common variations of Tuomas in Finland include Tuomo, Toomas, Tomas and Thoma. The nameday is the 21st of December. As of 2013 there are more than 32,000 people with this name in Finland.

Notable people
Some notable people who have this name include:

 Tuomas Aho, Finnish footballer
 Tuomas Anhava, Finnish writer 
 Tuomas Enbuske, Finnish radio and TV presenter and journalist
 Tuomas Gerdt, Finnish Knight of the Mannerheim Cross
 Tuomas Grönman, retired ice hockey player 
 Tuomas Haapala, Finnish footballer 
 Tuomas Holopainen, Finnish musician
 Tuomas Hoppu, Finnish historian 
 Tuomas Huhtanen, Finnish ice hockey left winger 
 Tuomas W. Hyrskymurto, Finnish merchant and communist 
 Tuomas Kansikas, Finnish footballer
 Tuomas Kantelinen, Finnish composer
 Tuomas Ketola, Finnish former tennis player
 Tuomas Kiiskinen, Finnish ice hockey player
 Tuomas Kuparinen, Finnish football player 
 Tuomas Kyrö, Finnish author and cartoonist
 Tuomas Kytömäki, Finnish actor
 Tuomas Latikka, Finnish football player 
 Tuomas Markkula, Finnish footballer
 Tuomas Nieminen, Finnish long track speed skater 
 Tuomas Tarkki, Finnish ice hockey goaltender
 Tuomas Peltonen, Finnish footballer
 Tuomas Pihlman, Finnish ice hockey player 
 Tuomas Planman, Finnish musician
 Tuomas Rannankari, Finnish footballer 
 Tuomas Rantanen, Finnish musician
 Tuomas Sammelvuo, Finnish volleyball player 
 Tuomas Santavuori, Finnish professional ice hockey forward 
 Tuomas Seppälä, Finnish musician
 Tuomas Suominen, Finnish ice hockey player
 Tuomas Vänttinen, Finnish ice hockey player
 Tuomas Vohlonen, Finnish inventor

References

See also
 Tuomo

Finnish masculine given names